Anyphaena is a genus of anyphaenid sac spiders first described by Carl Jakob Sundevall in 1833.

Species
 it contains eighty-five species in North America, Europe, Middle East and Southern and Eastern Asia:
A. accentuata (Walckenaer, 1802) – Europe to Central Asia, Iran
A. alachua Platnick, 1974 – USA
A. alamos Platnick & Lau, 1975 – Mexico
A. alboirrorata Simon, 1878 – Portugal, Spain, France
A. andina Chamberlin, 1916 – Peru
A. aperta (Banks, 1921) – USA, Canada
A. arbida Platnick, 1974 – USA
A. autumna Platnick, 1974 – USA
A. ayshides Yaginuma, 1958 – Japan
A. bermudensis Sierwald, 1988 – Bermuda
A. bispinosa Bryant, 1940 – Cuba
A. bromelicola Platnick, 1977 – Mexico
A. bryantae Roewer, 1951 – Cuba
A. californica (Banks, 1904) – USA
A. catalina Platnick, 1974 – USA, Mexico
A. celer (Hentz, 1847) – USA, Canada
A. cielo Platnick & Lau, 1975 – Mexico
A. cochise Platnick, 1974 – USA
A. cortes Platnick & Lau, 1975 – Mexico
A. crebrispina Chamberlin, 1919 – USA
A. cumbre Platnick & Lau, 1975 – Mexico
A. darlingtoni Bryant, 1940 – Cuba
A. decora Bryant, 1942 – Puerto Rico
A. diversa Bryant, 1936 – Cuba
A. dixiana (Chamberlin & Woodbury, 1929) – USA
A. dominicana Roewer, 1951 – Hispaniola
A. encino Platnick & Lau, 1975 – Mexico
A. felipe Platnick & Lau, 1975 – Mexico
A. fraterna (Banks, 1896) – USA
A. furcatella Banks, 1914 – Costa Rica
A. furva Miller, 1967 – France, Germany, Czech Rep., Slovakia
A. gertschi Platnick, 1974 – USA
A. gibba O. Pickard-Cambridge, 1896 – Mexico
A. gibboides Platnick, 1974 – USA
A. gibbosa O. Pickard-Cambridge, 1896 – Mexico
A. grovyle Lin & Li, 2021 — China (Hainan)
A. hespar Platnick, 1974 – USA, Mexico
A. inferens Chamberlin, 1925 – Costa Rica, Panama
A. judicata O. Pickard-Cambridge, 1896 – USA to Guatemala
A. kurilensis Peelle & Saito, 1932 – Russia (Kurile Is.)
A. lacka Platnick, 1974 – USA
A. leechi Platnick, 1977 – Mexico
A. maculata (Banks, 1896) – USA
A. marginalis (Banks, 1901) – USA, Mexico
A. modesta Bryant, 1948 – Hispaniola
A. mogan Song & Chen, 1987 – China
A. mollicoma Keyserling, 1879 – Colombia
A. morelia Platnick & Lau, 1975 – Mexico
A. nexuosa Chickering, 1940 – Panama
A. numida Simon, 1897 – Algeria, Portugal, Spain, France, Britain
A. obregon Platnick & Lau, 1975 – Mexico
A. otinapa Platnick & Lau, 1975 – Mexico
A. pacifica (Banks, 1896) – USA, Canada
A. pectorosa L. Koch, 1866 – USA, Canada
A. plana F. O. Pickard-Cambridge, 1900 – Panama
A. pontica Weiss, 1988 – Romania, Turkey
A. pretiosa Banks, 1914 – Costa Rica
A. proba O. Pickard-Cambridge, 1896 – Mexico
A. pugil Karsch, 1879 – Russia (Sakhalin, Kurile Is.), Korea, Japan
A. pusilla Bryant, 1948 – Hispaniola
A. quadricornuta Kraus, 1955 – El Salvador
A. rhynchophysa Feng, Ma & Yang, 2012 – China
A. rita Platnick, 1974 – USA, Mexico
A. sabina L. Koch, 1866 – Europe, Turkey, Caucasus
A. salto Platnick & Lau, 1975 – Mexico
A. sceptile Lin & Li, 2021 — China (Hainan)
A. scopulata F. O. Pickard-Cambridge, 1900 – Guatemala
A. shenzhen Lin & Li, 2021 — China
A. simoni Becker, 1878 – Mexico
A. simplex O. Pickard-Cambridge, 1894 – Mexico, Costa Rica
A. soricina Simon, 1889 – India
A. subgibba O. Pickard-Cambridge, 1896 – Guatemala
A. syriaca Kulczyński, 1911 – Lebanon, Israel
A. taiwanensis Chen & Huang, 2011 – Taiwan
A. tancitaro Platnick & Lau, 1975 – Mexico
A. tehuacan Platnick & Lau, 1975 – Mexico
A. tibet Lin & Li, 2021 — China
A. trifida F. O. Pickard-Cambridge, 1900 – Mexico, Guatemala
A. tuberosa F. O. Pickard-Cambridge, 1900 – Guatemala
A. wanlessi Platnick & Lau, 1975 – Mexico
A. wuyi Zhang, Zhu & Song, 2005 – China, Taiwan
A. xochimilco Platnick & Lau, 1975 – Mexico
A. yoshitakei Baba & Tanikawa, 2017 – Japan
A. zorynae Durán-Barrón, Pérez & Brescovit, 2016 – Mexico
A. zuyelenae Durán-Barrón, Pérez & Brescovit, 2016 – Mexico

References

External links

 Biolib
 Fauna Europaea
 Catalogue of Life
 The World Spider Catalog, Version 13.0 by Norman I. Platnick

Anyphaenidae
Araneomorphae genera
Cosmopolitan spiders
Taxa named by Carl Jakob Sundevall